The Municipality of Slovenska Bistrica is a municipality in the traditional region of Styria in northeastern Slovenia. The seat of the municipality is the town of Slovenska Bistrica. Slovenska Bistrica became a municipality in 1994.

Settlements
In addition to the municipal seat of Slovenska Bistrica, the municipality also includes the following settlements:

 Bojtina
 Brezje pri Slovenski Bistrici
 Bukovec
 Cezlak
 Cigonca
 Črešnjevec
 Devina
 Dolgi Vrh
 Drumlažno
 Farovec
 Fošt
 Frajhajm
 Gabernik
 Gaj
 Gladomes
 Hošnica
 Ješovec
 Jurišna Vas
 Kalše
 Kebelj
 Klopce
 Kočno ob Ložnici
 Kočno pri Polskavi
 Korplje
 Kostanjevec
 Kot na Pohorju
 Kovača Vas
 Križni Vrh
 Laporje
 Leskovec
 Levič
 Lokanja Vas
 Lukanja
 Malo Tinje
 Modrič
 Nadgrad
 Nova Gora nad Slovensko Bistrico
 Ogljenšak
 Ošelj
 Planina pod Šumikom
 Podgrad na Pohorju
 Pokoše
 Pragersko
 Preloge
 Prepuž
 Pretrež
 Radkovec
 Razgor pri Žabljeku
 Rep
 Ritoznoj
 Sele pri Polskavi
 Šentovec
 Sevec
 Šmartno na Pohorju
 Smrečno
 Spodnja Ložnica
 Spodnja Nova Vas
 Spodnja Polskava
 Spodnje Prebukovje
 Stari Log
 Tinjska Gora
 Trnovec pri Slovenski Bistrici
 Turiška Vas na Pohorju
 Urh
 Veliko Tinje
 Videž
 Vinarje
 Visole
 Vrhloga
 Vrhole pri Laporju
 Vrhole pri Slovenskih Konjicah
 Žabljek
 Zgornja Bistrica
 Zgornja Brežnica
 Zgornja Ložnica
 Zgornja Nova Vas
 Zgornja Polskava
 Zgornje Prebukovje

References

External links

Municipality of Slovenska Bistrica on Geopedia
Municipality of Slovenska Bistrica website

 
Slovenska Bistrica
1994 establishments in Slovenia